Callyspongia elegans is a species of demosponge in the genus Callyspongia.

References

Callyspongiidae
Sponges described in 1887